= Kumanovo Library =

Library in Kumanovo, North Macedonia

Library Tane Georgievski Kumanovo
- Библиотека Тане Георгиевки Куманово
- Location: Kumanovo, North Macedonia
- Type: Public library
- Established: 1945
- Branch of: Ministry of Education and Science of North Macedonia
- Branches: 2

Other information
- Website: Official page

Kumanovo library (Macedonian: Библиотека Куманово) is a public library in Kumanovo, North Macedonia.
